In the Name of the People is an American television movie drama. It was released in 2000 by CBS Productions and Jaffe/Braunstein Films. The movie was filmed in Vancouver, British Columbia, Canada. It was based on the play by Tim Boland.

Plot

The movie focuses on the Murphy family, whose daughter was murdered by John Burke. Sentenced to death, the man realises that his daughter will become an orphan. Unexpectedly he asks the Murphys to care for her.

Cast
 Amy Madigan as Connie Murphy  
 Richard Thomas as Jack Murphy 
 Kimberley Warnat as Jenny Murphy
 Samantha Joy as Young Jenny Murphy
 Scott Bakula as John Burke  
 Robin Anne Phipps as Lisa Burke  
 Mary Black as Lynette Burke  
 Gillian Barber as Counselor
 Robert Wisden as DA Paul McMillan   
 Mark Mullan as Cruel child #1  
 Hailey Jenkins as Cruel child #2  
 Clay St. Thomas as Reporter  
 Max Teichman as Teacher  
 Guy Villeneuve as Reporter  
 Bonnie Smart as Secretary   
 Cameron K. Smith as Death Penalty Protester

References

2000 films
2000 television films
2000 drama films
CBS network films
Films scored by Mark Snow
Films about capital punishment
Films about orphans
Films shot in Vancouver
2000s English-language films
Films directed by Peter Levin